Jason Kasdorf (born May 18, 1992) is a Canadian former professional ice hockey goaltender. He was last contracted with the Manitoba Moose in the American Hockey League (AHL). Kasdorf was originally selected by the Winnipeg Jets in the sixth round (157th overall) of the 2011 NHL Entry Draft.

Playing career

Amateur
Kasdorf attended Rensselaer Polytechnic Institute where he played with the NCAA Men's Division I RPI Engineers of the ECAC Hockey conference. In his freshman year, Kasdorf's outstanding play was rewarded when he was selected as the 2012–13 ECAC Hockey Rookie of the Year and was named to the All-ECAC Second Team.

Professional
On February 11, 2015, the Winnipeg Jets traded Kasdorf, along with Evander Kane and Zach Bogosian, to the Sabres in exchange for Tyler Myers, Drew Stafford, Joel Armia, Brendan Lemieux, and a conditional first-round pick in the 2015 NHL Entry Draft.

On March 14, 2016, Kasdorf signed a one-year, entry-level contract with the Buffalo Sabres of the National Hockey League. He made his NHL debut on April 8, 2016. At the conclusion of the season, Kasdorf having completed his brief rookie contract, agreed to a two-year extension on July 18, 2016.

Kasdorf failed to add to his lone appearance with the Sabres through the duration of his contract, and was further unable to gain a footing with primary affiliate, the Rochester Americans in the American Hockey League. He was assigned to the ECHL with secondary affiliates, the Elmira Jackals and the Cincinnati Cyclones.

As a restricted free agent, Kasdorf was not qualified by the Sabres and was released as a free agent on June 26, 2018. Un-signed over the summer, Kasdorf signed a professional tryout contract to join the Lehigh Valley Phantoms training camp on September 28, 2018 before he was released from his tryout on October 8. With limited contract offers, Kasdorf briefly signed in Europe with German club, Lausitzer Füchse of the DEL2. He made 2 appearances with the Foxes, both losses, in his only action for the 2018–19 season.

Kasdorf remained a free agent into the 2019–20 season, Kasdorf returned to his hometown in Winnipeg, Manitoba. On March 1, 2020, he was signed to a professional try-out with hometown club, the Manitoba Moose, to provide cover at the backup position.

Career statistics

Awards and honors

References

External links 
 

1992 births
Living people
Buffalo Sabres players
Canadian ice hockey goaltenders
Cincinnati Cyclones (ECHL) players
Des Moines Buccaneers players
Elmira Jackals (ECHL) players
Lausitzer Füchse players
Portage Terriers players
Rochester Americans players
RPI Engineers men's ice hockey players
Ice hockey people from Winnipeg
Winnipeg Jets draft picks
Canadian expatriate ice hockey players in the United States